Pete Anderson is an American guitarist, music producer, arranger and songwriter.

Anderson is most known for his guitar work with, and critically acclaimed production of, country music star Dwight Yoakam from 1984 through 2002, a partnership that resulted in numerous platinum records, sold-out tours, and some music in the Bakersfield and hillbilly traditions. On guitar, Anderson's technical proficiency and versatility allows him to perform a variety of styles, including country, western, rock, rockabilly, soul, blues, Flamenco, Tex-Mex.

Among the artists Anderson has produced are Dwight Yoakam, Roy Orbison, Meat Puppets, Jackson Browne, Michelle Shocked, Buck Owens, k.d. Lang, Steve Pryor Band, Lonesome Strangers, and Lucinda Williams. He more recently produced Mark Chesnutt's album Outlaw (2010).

Record label
In 1993, along with Dusty Wakeman, Anderson joined Barbara Hein, a longtime Capitol Records executive with a history in the music business, and engineer Michael Dumas to form Little Dog Records. Recording his first solo CD on his own label in 1994, Anderson placed himself on the road in support of Working Class, a country-blues-rock-roots music extravaganza produced by Wakeman. While continuing to work with Yoakam, being the president of a record label opened new worlds for Anderson. Signing artists that he and his partners believed in gave Anderson the creative freedom he craved. Having to be part businessman and part artist was a difficult part to play every day, but Anderson proved he was up to the challenge when he negotiated a distribution deal with Polygram in 1996. Anderson stuck with Wakeman for his second release, 1997's Dogs In Heaven.

Discography
 Solo albums
Working Class (1994)
Dogs In Heaven (1997)
Live At Ohio University (1998)
Daredevil (2004)
Even Things Up (2009)
Birds Above Guitarland (2013)
Live At The Moose (2015)

 With Dwight Yoakam
Guitars, Cadillacs, Etc., Etc. (1986)
Hillbilly Deluxe (1987)
Buenas Noches From a Lonely Room (1988)
Just Lookin' for a Hit (1989) compilation
If There Was a Way (1990)
"Suspicious Minds" (Single) (1992)
La Croix D'Amour (1992) compilation
This Time (1993)
Gone (1995)
Dwight Live (1995)
Under the Covers (1997)
Come On Christmas (1997)
A Long Way Home (1998)
Last Chance for a Thousand Years (1999) compilation
"Crazy Little Thing Called Love" (Single) (1999)
dwightyoakamacoustic.net (2000)
Tomorrow's Sounds Today (2000)
South of Heaven, West of Hell (Soundtrack) (2001)
Reprise Please Baby (2002) 4CD compilation
Population Me (2003)
In Others' Words (2003) compilation
Dwight's Used Records (2004) compilation
The Very Best of Dwight Yoakam (2004) compilation
Live from Austin, TX (1988, [rel. 2005])

 With Michelle Shocked
Short Sharp Shocked (1988) producer, arranger, electric guitar, bass, 6-string bass
Captain Swing (1989) producer, arranger, electric guitar
Beautiful Dreamer - The Songs Of Stephen Foster (2004) producer, acoustic guitar on "Oh Susana"

 With Various artists
 Stealin' Horses: Stealin' Horses (1985): guitar
 The Lonesome Strangers: Lonesome Pine (1986): producer
 Rosie Flores: Rosie Flores (1987): producer, arranger, guitar, bass, mandolin
 Asleep At The Wheel: 10 (1987): guitar
 The Black Velvet Band: When Justice Came (1989): producer, guitar, mandolin
 Darden Smith: Trouble No More (1990): producer, guitar
 Martin Stephenson and the Daintees: Left Us To Burn (1990): producer
 Jackson Browne: "First Girl I Loved" (Single) (1990): producer, arranger
 Blue Rodeo: Casino (1991): producer, guitar, mandolin
 Meat Puppets: Forbidden Places (1991): producer
 Thelonius Monster: Beautiful Mess (1991): producer
 Steve Pryor Band: Steve Pryor Band (Zoo Entertainment) (1991): producer
 Flaco Jimenez: Partners (1992): guitar
 Steve Forbert: American In Me (1992): producer, guitar
 Buck Owens: The Buck Owens Collection (1959-1990) (1992): producer, guitar
 Roy Orbison: King Of Hearts (1992): producer
 Bobby Crynor: Bobby Crynor (1992): guitar
 Anthony Crawford: Anthony Crawford (1993): producer, guitar, harmonica
 Jim Matt: All My Wild Oats (1994): producer
 The Mavericks: What A Crying Shame (1994): songwriter on "Neon Blue"
 Jeff Finlin: Highway Diaries (1995): producer
 Carl Peterson: Scotland The Brave (1995): drums
 Scott Joss: Souvenirs (1996): producer, arranger, guitar
 Sara Evans: Three Chords & The Truth (1997): producer, arranger, guitar, bass
 The Lonesome Strangers: Land Of Opportunity (1997): producer
 Mark Insley: Good Country Junk (1997): guitar
 The Backsliders: Throwin' Rocks At The Moon (1997): producer
 The Blazers: Just For You (1997): producer, guitar
 Joy Lynn White: Lucky Few (1997): producer, guitar
 Wooden Circus: Wooden Circus (Lemon Drop) (1998): producer
 Heather Myles: Highways & Honky Tonks (1998): guitar
 Scott Joss: Invite Scott Joss Into Your Living Room (1998): producer
 Amanda Garrigues: Spirit Act (1999): engineer
 Flaco Jimenez: Sleepytown (2000): producer, guitar
 Scott Joss: A New Reason To Care (2000): producer, guitar
 Blue Rodeo: Greatest Hits (2001): producer
 William Norman Edwards: Down Here (2001): producer, guitar, bass, mandolin, banjo
 Danni Leigh: Divide And Conquer (2001): producer
 Jim Lauderdale: Point Of No Return - The Unreleased 1989 Album (2001): producer
 The Blazers: Seventeen Jewels (2003): producer
 Moot Davis: Moot Davis (2003): producer, guitar
 Cisco: 7740 Valmont St. (2004): producer, arranger, guitar
 Curt Kirkwood: Snow (2005): producer, guitar, bass, mandolin
 Chris Jones: Too Far Down The Road (2006): producer, guitar, bass, mandolin, banjo
 Jason Boland: The Bourbon Legend (2006): producer
 BJ Thomas: "Nashville Rain" (Single) (2006): producer, guitar, sitar, bass
 Erasure: "Boy (Remix)" (2006): producer, guitar
 Adam Hood: Different Groove (2007): producer, arranger, guitar, lap steel guitar, mandolin, percussion
 Moot Davis: Already Moved On (2007): producer, guitar
 The Blazers: Dreaming A Dream (2008): producer
 Tanya Tucker: My Turn (2001): producer, guitar, bass, harmonica, mandolin
 Mark Chesnutt: Outlaw (2010): producer, guitar, bass, drums
 Grayson Hugh: Back To The Soul (2015): guest artist, guitar solo on "Rock 'N' Roll Man"
 Lightnin' Willie & the Poorboys: No Black No White Just Blues (2017): producer

 Compilation albums
 A Town South of Bakersfield (1985) producer, arranger, acoustic & electric guitar, mandolin, 6-string bass
 Honky Tonk Country (Warner Bros.) (1986) producer, guitar
 Country Jukebox (Warner Bros.) (1986) producer, guitar
 A Town South of Bakersfield 2 (1988) producer, arranger, acoustic & electric guitar, mandolin, 6-string bass
 A Christmas Tradition, Volume II (1988) producer
 The New Tradition Sings The Old Tradition (1989) producer, guitar
 Classic Country Music: A Smithsonian Collection, Volume IV (1991) guitar 
 Rockin' Country (1991) producer
 Favorite Country Duets (1991) producer
 Country Jukebox: Greatest Hits, Volume Two (1993) producer
 It's Now or Never: The Tribute To Elvis Presley (1994) guitar
 Little Dog Records: 1996 Sampler (1996) producer, multiple instruments
 The Best of Austin City Limits (1996) guitar
 Christmas Country (Warner Bros.) (1996) producer
 The Songs of Jimmie Rodgers: A Tribute (1997) producer, arranger, guitar
 The Songs of Dwight Yoakam: Will Sing For Food (1998) producer, dobro, guitar, mandolin, percussion
 Country Love Songs, Volume Four (2000) producer 
 Hits of The Nineties, Volume One (Warner Bros.) (2000) producer
 Super Hits: Super Hats (2000) producer
 Favorite Country Duets, Volume 2 (2000) producer
 Young Guitar Slingers: Texas Blues Evolution (Antone's/Texas Music Group) (2001) producer, harmonica
 A Country Superstar Christmas 4 (2001) producer
 Totally Country (17 New Chart-Topping Hits) (2002) producer
 A Country West of Nashville (Little Dog) (2003) producer, multiple instruments

References

External links
PeteAnderson.com Official Website
Little Dog Records Pete's Record Label and Music
Pete Anderson 2014 Interview on Guitar.com

American country guitarists
American male guitarists
Living people
American country record producers
1948 births
Place of birth missing (living people)
Guitarists from Detroit
20th-century American guitarists
Country musicians from Michigan
20th-century American male musicians
21st-century American guitarists
21st-century American male musicians